Michael Davitt's GAC Swatragh is a Gaelic Athletic Association club based in the village of Swatragh. The club is a member of the Derry GAA and currently caters for Gaelic football, hurling and camogie. The club is named after republican patriot and revolutionary Michael Davitt.

Swatragh fields Gaelic football and hurling teams at U8, U10, U12, U14, U16, Minor, Reserve, Thirds and Senior levels. There are also camogie teams across similar age groups. The current club chairman is Cormac McCormack.

2019 Championship Football

2018 Championship Football

2017 Championship Football

History
In 1946 John McCormack proposed the idea of forming a Gaelic football club in Swatragh. Other founder members included Patsy Collins, Jim McMullan, John Eddie Friel and James McGurk. They choose to name the club after Michael Davitt, because he had given Irish Land League speeches in Swatragh in the late 19th century. It also marked 100 years since Davitt's birth. The club colours were initially red and white, but in 1949 the present green and white colours were adopted.

The club's first major success came in 1952 when it won the South Derry Junior Football Championship and the South Derry Junior Football League. Swatragh regained the South Derry Junior Championship in 1955 and went on to win that year's Derry Junior Football Championship. Davitt's added a further Derry Junior Championship in 1961. In 1972 Swatragh won its first Derry Intermediate Football Championship and won it again seven years later. In 1988 the club won the Derry Minor Football Championship.

In 1993 the club reached the Derry Senior Football Championship final for the only time in their history, but were defeated by Lavey GAC on Boxing Day (the fixture was moved back by a few months due to the senior county team winning the 1993 All-Ireland Senior Football Championship)

Hurling began in the club in 1976, under the stewardship of Patsy Quigg.  Since then, the club has, at one stage or another, collected every underage title available.  They have appeared in three Derry Senior Hurling Championship finals.  They lost out to Kevin Lynch's of Dungiven in 2008 and to Robert Emmet's Slaughtneil in 2015 but secured the club's only (male) Senior title to date when they defeated St Mary's Banagher in the 2012 decider in Celtic Park.

Honours

Football

Senior
Derry Intermediate Football Championship: 3
1972, 1979, 2012
Derry Junior Football Championship: 2
1955, 1961
South Derry Junior Football Championship: 1
1952, 1955
South Derry Junior Football League: 1
1952
Graham Cup Champions: 1
2007
McGlinchey Cup Champions: 1
2009

Minor
 Derry Minor Football Championship: 1
 1988
 South Derry Minor League and Championship Winners: 1
 1996

Under-14
 Derry Under-14 'B' Football Championship: 1
 2007
 South Derry Under-14 'B' Football Championship: 2
 1997 2007
 South Derry Under-14 'B' Football League: 1
 2007

Hurling

Senior
 Derry Senior Hurling Championship: 1
 2012
 Derry Intermediate Hurling Championship: 4
 1997, 1998, 2018, 2020
 Oireachtas Cup: 3
 2006, 2007, 2009
Derry Senior Hurling League: 2
 2008, 2011
Ulster Hurling League Division 2: 1
 2008

Minor
Derry Minor Hurling Championship: 1
2004

Under-16
 Derry Under-16 Hurling Championship: 3
 2000, 2011. 2012

Under-14
 Derry Féile na nGael: 1
 2002
 Derry 'B' Féile na nGael: 1
 2006
 2019

Camogie

U-14 All Ireland Féile champions 2008, Ulster Féile champions 2008

Note: The above lists may be incomplete. Please add any other honours you know of.

Well known players
Anthony Tohill – member of Derry's 1993 All-Ireland winning team. Four-time All Star winner.
Anton Tohill
Ruairi Convery – Derry hurler and former Derry footballer. Was part of the Derry Minor side that won the 2002 Ulster Minor Championship and All-Ireland Minor Championship.

See also
Derry Senior Football Championship
Derry Senior Hurling Championship
List of Gaelic games clubs in Derry
Enda McGinley, manager with the club

References

External links
Swatragh GAC

Gaelic games clubs in County Londonderry
Gaelic football clubs in County Londonderry
Hurling clubs in County Londonderry